Father of Four and Uncle Sofus is a 1957 Danish family film directed by Alice O'Fredericks and Robert Saaskin.

Cast
Karl Stegger as father
Birgitte Bruun as Søs
Otto Møller Jensen as Ole
Rudi Hansen as Mie
Ole Neumann as Lille Per
Peter Malberg as Uncle Anders / Sofus
Ib Mossin as Peter
Agnes Rehni as the neighbor, Agnes Sejersen
Preben Kaas as Peter's friend
Einar Juhl as the principal
Kirsten Passer as Ludvigsen, a teacher
Holger Juul Hansen as the teacher
Henry Nielsen as a plane passenger
Grethe Kausland as Lille Grete (as Grete Nielsen)
Povl Wøldike as Lille Grete's father
Åsta Hjelm as Lille Grete's mother

External links

1957 films
1950s Danish-language films
Films directed by Alice O'Fredericks
Films scored by Sven Gyldmark
ASA Filmudlejning films
Father of Four